Bolognini is an Italian surname. Notable people with the surname include:

 Antonio Bolognini (died 1461), Roman Catholic prelate
 Carlo Bolognini (1678–1704), Italian painter of the Baroque
 Ennio Bolognini (1893–1979), Argentine-born American cellist, guitarist and composer
 Eugenia Attendolo Bolognini (1837–1914), Italian noblewoman and philanthropist 
 Giacomo Bolognini (1664–1734), Italian painter
 Giovanni Battista Bolognini (1611–1688), Italian painter and engraver
 Maurizio Bolognini (born 1952), Italian post-conceptual artist
 Mauro Bolognini (1922–2001), Italian film director
 Nepomuceno Bolognini (1823–1900), officer of Garibaldi

Italian-language surnames